Anagelasta apicalis is a species of beetle in the family Cerambycidae. It was described by Pic in 1925. It is known from Laos, China and Vietnam.

References

Mesosini
Beetles described in 1925